Swing Vote is a 2008 American comedy-drama film about an entire U.S. presidential election determined by the vote of one man. It was directed by Joshua Michael Stern, and stars Kevin Costner, Paula Patton, Kelsey Grammer, Dennis Hopper, Nathan Lane, Stanley Tucci, George Lopez and Madeline Carroll. The film was released on August 1, 2008.

Plot

In a presidential election set in an alternate 2008, Bud Johnson (Kevin Costner) is a dimwitted, jobless, apolitical man from Texico, New Mexico, coaxed by his twelve-year-old daughter Molly (Madeline Carroll) to take more of a serious approach to life. Molly runs the household and sees an opportunity on election day to energize her father.

Frustrated by Bud’s apathy toward voting, Molly sneaks into her local polling place and tries to vote on behalf of Bud. However, because the voting machines are unplugged, the ballot is registered, but no decision is indicated on which candidate receives the vote. As the election is close, Bud's vote becomes critical to allocating New Mexico's electoral college votes.

The popular vote is tied for the two major candidates in New Mexico, leaving Bud to decide the next president of the United States. He gets wooed by both candidates, the incumbent Republican, Andrew Carington Boone (Kelsey Grammer) and the opposing Democrat, Vermont Senator Donald Greenleaf (Dennis Hopper). Both candidates are aided by their respective campaign managers, Martin Fox (Stanley Tucci) and Art Crumb (Nathan Lane).

Bud's actual opinions (or lack thereof) are misinterpreted by the media, causing the candidates to flip-flop on several positions (the Democrats take an anti-abortion and anti-illegal immigration position, while the Republicans take a pro-environmental and pro-gay marriage position). The two candidates are shown to move away from the cynical tactics forced on them by their advisers, and both gain Bud's respect.

In the end, Bud chooses to hold a final debate the day before he is set to recast his ballot. In a written speech, he confesses that he knows little-to-nothing about politics, or for that matter, life, and decides to ask questions people have sent to him in the mail. The film ends with Bud casting his vote as Molly watches with a smile on her face, though for whom he voted is never revealed.

Cast

As themselves

Production
Swing Vote was shot primarily in Albuquerque and Belen, New Mexico. Although not intended as a political statement on the then-upcoming presidential elections, when Kevin Costner found he could not get the financing he wanted for Swing Vote to get it into theaters in time for the 2008 presidential election, he bankrolled it himself.

Joshua Michael Stern, who directed and co-wrote the script with Jason Richman, had earlier precedents to follow. The premise of the film is similar to an Isaac Asimov story "Franchise", in which elections have evolved until the entire decision is based on one man chosen by Multivac. The premise of Garson Kanin’s 1939 movie The Great Man Votes is also very similar to Swing Vote. A 1966 episode of the TV series F Troop, "The Ballot of Corporal Agarn", uses the same basic storyline.

Reception

Critical response
The film received mostly negative reviews by critics. On Rotten Tomatoes, the film has an approval rating of 38% based on 145 reviews, with an average rating of 5.4/10. The website's critical consensus reads, "Despite Kevin Costner providing his most charismatic performance in years, Swing Vote fails to find the right mix of political satire and heartfelt drama." On Metacritic the film has a weighted average score of 47 out of 100, based on reviews from 30 critics, indicating "mixed or average reviews". Audiences polled by CinemaScore gave the film an average grade of "B" on an A+ to F scale.

Reaction from critics centered on Costner's performance. One characterized it as "unsentimental", but handled "with such ease and conviction" that it anchors the film. Roger Ebert noted that in building the premise, "the movie makes a plucky stab at explaining how it comes to happen – and it almost sounds plausible." He gave it three stars, saying that a "mix of comedy and drama is winning; Costner couldn't be better, and the little girl is a find." Mick LaSalle of the San Francisco Chronicle also gave it favorable reviews. Richard Roeper was quoted as saying, "Not a bad movie, probably OK to rent on DVD, but I'm saying don't rush to the theaters." The Times of the UK ranked Swing Vote no. 14 on its list of the 100 Worst Films of 2008.

Box office
The film grossed $16,289,867 domestically and $1,344,446 overseas totaling $17,634,313 worldwide. On its opening weekend, the film grossed $6,230,669, placing it #6.

After release, a controversy arose when Dennis Hopper complained about his role being cut; in a series of interviews, he claimed, "I got cut out of that movie".

Lawsuit
Bradley Blakeman, a former deputy assistant for appointments and scheduling to President George W. Bush, filed a lawsuit on August 7, 2008, stating that he gave Kelsey Grammer a copyrighted screenplay titled Go November in 2006. The lawsuit, filed at the United States District Court for the Eastern District of New York in Long Island, New York, was against Grammer, Kevin Costner (co-financier), The Walt Disney Company (owner of the film rights), Walt Disney Motion Pictures Group Inc. (production company), and Touchstone Pictures (distributor), and claims that the plot and marketing elements of Swing Vote were stolen from him.

The case was eventually settled for  after the judge dismissed his other claims against Costner and Disney.

Home media
The film was released by Touchstone Home Entertainment on DVD and Blu-ray Disc on January 13, 2009.

References
Notes

Bibliography

 Wills, Dominic. "Kevin Costner Biography". tiscali.co.uk. Retrieved: May 16, 2008.

External links

 
 
 
 Swing Vote review on PinkNews

2000s English-language films
2000s political comedy-drama films
2008 films
American political comedy-drama films
American political satire films
Films about presidential elections
Films directed by Joshua Michael Stern
Films involved in plagiarism controversies
Films scored by John Debney
Films set in New Mexico
Films shot in New Mexico
Touchstone Pictures films
2000s American films